The Handball Association of Thailand (HAT) is the administrative and controlling body for handball and beach handball in Thailand. HAT is a member of the Asian Handball Federation (AHF) and member of the International Handball Federation (IHF) since 1998.

National teams
 Thailand men's national handball team
 Thailand men's national junior handball team
 Thailand women's national handball team
 Thailand national beach handball team
 Thailand women's national beach handball team

Competitions hosted
 2020 Asian Youth Beach Handball Championship
 2017 Asian Beach Handball Championship
 2014 Asian Beach Games
 2013 Asian Women's Youth Handball Championship
 2016 Asian Youth Beach Handball Championship
 2009 Asian Women's Junior Handball Championship
 2008 Asian Women's Handball Championship
 2006 Asian Men's Handball Championship
 2005 Asian Women's Youth Handball Championship
 2005 Asian Men's Youth Handball Championship
 2004 Asian Women's Junior Handball Championship
 2002 Asian Men's Junior Handball Championship
 1998 Asian Games

References

External links
 Thailand at the IHF website.
 Thailand at the AHF website.

Sports organizations established in 1997
1997 establishments in Thailand
Handball governing bodies
Handball in Thailand
Sports governing bodies in Thailand
Asian Handball Federation
National members of the International Handball Federation